Stenoma crypsangela is a moth in the family Depressariidae. It was described by Edward Meyrick in 1932. It is found in Peru.

References

Moths described in 1932
Stenoma